Robert Cole may refer to:

Entertainment
Robert William Cole (1869–1937), British writer
Bob Cole (composer) (1868–1911), American composer
Bobby Cole (musician) (1932–1996), American musician

Sports
Bob Cole (cricketer) (born 1938), former English cricketer
Bob Cole (sportscaster) (born 1933), Canadian sports announcer
Bobby Cole (golfer) (born 1948), South African golfer

Other
Robert Cole (MP), Member of Parliament for Gloucester
Robert G. Cole (1915–1944), American soldier who received the Medal of Honor
Robert MacFarlan Cole III (1889–1986), American chemical engineer, inventor, and author

See also
 Robert G. Cole Junior-Senior High School, San Antonio, Texas, United States
 Robert Coles (disambiguation)
 Cole (name)